Queens of the Ring is a 2013 French comedy film directed by Jean-Marc Rudnicki. The film was supported by WWE Studios.

Plot
A single mother with a criminal past is upset by being ignored by her child who is growing into adolescence and preferring the company of his school friends to hers. She decides to appeal to the only thing that her son is interested in by training with her workmates from the supermarket to become a female wrestler.

Cast 
 Marilou Berry as Rose / Rosa Croft
 Nathalie Baye as Colette / Wonder Colette
 Audrey Fleurot as Jessica / Calamity Jess
 Corinne Masiero as Viviane / Kill Biloute
 André Dussollier as Richard Cœur de Lion
 Isabelle Nanty as Sandrine Pédrono
 Jacques Frantz as Tonio
 Émilie Gavois-Kahn as Evelyne
 CM Punk, The Miz & Eve Torres as Themselves

References

External links 
 

2013 films
French sports comedy films
2010s sports comedy films
Sport wrestling films
2013 comedy films
2010s French films